Gianluca Mager (born 1 December 1994) is an Italian tennis player. He has a career-high ATP singles ranking of No. 66 achieved on 13 September 2021. He also has a career high ATP doubles ranking of No. 310 achieved on 10 June 2019.

Personal Info
Born in Liguria, from a family of German origins.

In 2010, Mager was disqualified for failing a doping test after smoking marijuana at a party.

Professional career
Mager made his ATP main draw debut at the 2017 Internazionali BNL d'Italia after earning a wildcard in the pre-qualifying wildcard tournament. He was defeated by Aljaž Bedene in the first round.

He got his first singles ATP main-draw win in the first round in Stockholm in October 2019 against Spaniard Pablo Andújar.

At the 2020 Rio Open in Brazil, an ATP 500 level tournament on clay courts, he beat world No. 34 Casper Ruud in the first round, and world No. 4 Dominic Thiem in the quarterfinals to reach the semifinal as a qualifier. Mager reached his first ATP Tour final, defeating lucky loser Attila Balazs in the semifinals before losing to Chilean Cristian Garín, 6–73–7, 5–7. Mager started the tournament No. 114 in the world and qualified into the main draw. After this good performance, Mager reached a singles ranking of World No. 77.

At the 2021 Sofia Open Mager reached his fourth quarterfinal of the season at the ATP250 level (after Delray Beach, Belgrade and Kitzbuhel) defeating 6th seed Adrian Mannarino and Miomir Kecmanovic. He lost in the quarterfinals to Gael Monfils 6-2, 6-2 in 50 minutes. He was aiming to reach his second tour-level semifinal and first since 2020 in Rio de Janeiro.

ATP career finals

Singles: 1 (1 runner–up)

Challenger and Futures finals

Singles: 16 (9–7)

Doubles: 6 (2–4)

Record against top 10 players

Gianluca's match record against those who have been ranked in the top 10, with those who have been No. 1 in bold (ATP World Tour, Grand Slam and Davis Cup main draw matches).

  Dominic Thiem 1–0
  Pablo Carreno Busta 0–1
  Grigor Dimitrov 0–1
  Felix Auger-Aliassime 0–1
  Gaël Monfils 0–2

*

Wins over top 10 players
He has a  record against players who were, at the time the match was played, ranked in the top 10

*

References

External links
 
 

1994 births
Living people
Italian male tennis players
Italian people of German descent